Chamaraja Wodeyar I (Bettada Chamaraja; 1408 – 1459) was the second raja of the Kingdom of Mysore from 1423, right after his father's death, until his own in 1459. He was the elder son of Yaduraya.

Inheritance and expansion 
He inherited a crown for which recognition and respect was growing amongst people. However, the realm the 24-year-old crown controlled had just taken the form of a principality and a young kingdom. Further, Mysore Kingdom was a subordinate power to the Vijayanagara Empire and wouldn't survive without aids and grants from the high command. When Chamaraja Wadiyar I ascended the throne, the Vijayanagara Empire, although prosperous and a militarily super power in India, was under political crisis, with successive and frequent assassinations of the Sangama emperors. His father also faced similar problems, owing to which the persistence of their own power was called into question at times. In spite of political uncertainty in the empire, Mysore saw slow but steady expansion by accession of unincorporated villages and towns in and around Mysore, both during Yaduraya and Chamaraja Wodeyar's reigns.

Soon after Chamaraja Wodeyar I's taking over power, Vijaya Bukka Raya died. However, his successor, Deva Raya II, proved to be an able politician as much as the administrator he was. Deva Raya, with Chamaraja Wodeyar I in Mysore, came to become the most powerful ruler in his time in India, and is regarded as the greatest ruler of the Sangama dynasty. Hence, Deva Raya II's reign, and transitively Chamaraja Wodeyar I's, is regarded as the golden era of South India under the Vijayanagara Empire.

Chamaraja Wodeyar took village-level organisations and other governing bodies beyond his domain under his control, without resorting to military action, thereby diplomatically accessing not only remote, uninhabited places, but also those with settlements. He is also noted for checking and containing the contempt of the remnant Dalvoys for the Vijayanagara Empire and the new Kingdom of Mysore.

Growing threats of foreigners 
The Mughal rulers, like the Bahmani and Deccan sultanates, had already conquered several northern Hindu kingdoms and were marching down South. The glorious stories of the Vijayanagara Empire had reached through the Muslim world to the West during Deva Raya II's empire. The European invasion was a fast-approaching threat, which was to be countered by a perpetual royal family in both Vijayanagara and Mysore, two of very few strong Hindu powers in India.

Mysore establishment, perpetuity, and death 
Chamaraja Wodeyar I died in 1459. He ruled under three emperors, Vijaya Bukka Raya briefly, Deva Raya II for the most part of his rule, and finally under Mallikarjuna Raya for nearly a decade. With his father's 24-year and his own 36-year reigns, Mysore had already come to be recognised as Vijayanagara Empire's prodigy and a potential successor in case of the Empire's disintegration, which, in the course of a century and a half, proved to be true. The focus had begun to shift on Mysore because of several reasons, some being royal-family-feud in Vijayanagara, interim emperors, and other incompetent subordinate rulers parallel to the Mysore rajas. However, after Deva Raya II's coming to power, both Vijayanagara and Mysore began to flourish in development.

See also
 Yaduraya
 Deva Raya II
 Wadiyar Dynasty
 Maharaja of Mysore
 Kingdom of Mysore
 Vijayanagara Empire

External links
 Mysore Palace and the Wodeyar Dynasty

1408 births
1459 deaths
Kings of Mysore
Chamaraja 01